The 1898 Swarthmore Quakers football team was an American football team that represented Swarthmore College as an independent during the 1898 college football season. The team compiled a 9–2 record and outscored opponents by a total of 152 to 64. Jacob K. Shell was the head coach.

Schedule

References

Swarthmore
Swarthmore Garnet Tide football seasons
Swarthmore Quakers football